Sale Ngahkwe (c. 875–934) was king of Pagan dynasty of Burma (Myanmar) from c. 904 to c. 934. According to the Burmese chronicles, Ngahkwe, a descendant of King Thingayaza of Pagan but brought up in obscurity at Sale in central Burma, came to work in the service of King Tannet as a stable groom. Ngahkwe then assassinated the king and seized the throne.

Various Burmese chronicles do not agree on the dates regarding his life and reign. The oldest chronicle Zatadawbon Yazawin is considered to be the most accurate for the Pagan period. The table below lists the dates given by four main chronicles, as well as Hmannan's dates when anchored by the Anawrahta's inscriptionally verified accession date of 1044.

References

Bibliography
 
 
 

Pagan dynasty
870s births
934 deaths
Year of birth uncertain
10th-century Burmese monarchs